Leptonotus vincentae is a species of pipefish found in the south-west Atlantic Ocean.

Size

Etymology
The fish is named  in honor of ocean fisheries biologist Amanda Vincent of the University of British Columbia, Director and co-founder of Project Seahorse, "whose work on conservation of syngnathids has increased our chances of having healthy populations of these fishes in the threatened seas of the world."

References

Taxa named by Diego César Luzzatto
Taxa named by Maria Lourdes Estalles
Fish described in 2019
vincentae